Rafael Reis Kneif (born 24 April 1992 in Sorocaba) is a Brazilian footballer who plays as a defender.

He also holds Portuguese citizenship.

Football career
On 23 February 2015, Kneif made his professional debut with Ceahlăul Piatra Neamț in a 2014–15 Liga I match against CFR Cluj.

References

External links

1992 births
Living people
Brazilian footballers
Association football defenders
Liga I players
CSM Ceahlăul Piatra Neamț players
People from Sorocaba
Footballers from São Paulo (state)